Luis Ramón Leante Chacón (born June 6, 1963, Caravaca de la Cruz), commonly known as Luis Leante, is a Spanish novelist and 	Latin professor.

Leante graduated in Classical Philology from the University of Murcia. He has lived in Alicante since 1992, where he worked as a high school teacher until 2009. He published his first novel at the age of 20, but it was not until 2007, after winning the Alfaguara Prize with his novel See How Much I Love You (in Spanish, Mira si yo te querré), that he began to devote himself entirely to literature. Another of his novels, Red Moon (in Spanish, La luna roja), published in Spain in 2009, is a gripping story between a writer and translator, set in Alicante, Berlin and Istanbul.

Bibliography

Novels
 Camino del jueves rojo (1983).
 Paisaje con río y Baracoa de fondo (1997).
 Al final del trayecto (1997).
 La Edad de Plata (1998).
 El canto del zaigú (2000).
 El vuelo de las termitas (2003).
 Academia Europa (2003).
 Mira si yo te querré (2007; tr: See How Much I Love You).
 La Luna Roja (2009; tr: Red Moon).
 Cárceles imaginarias (2012).
 Annobón (2017).

Short Stories
 El último viaje de Efraín (1986).
 El criador de canarios (1996).

Children's Novels
 La puerta trasera del paraíso (2007).
 Rebelión en Nueva Granada (2008).
 Justino Lumbreras detective privado (2012).
 Justino Lumbreras y el fantasma del museo (2012).
 Justino Lumbreras y el collar de Cleopatra (2013).
 Justino Lumbreras y el Gran Caruso (2013).
 Huye sin mirar atrás (2016).
 Maneras de vivir (2020).

References

External links
Personal web
Official blog
Information about the writer in his publisher's website

1963 births
Living people
People from Caravaca de la Cruz
20th-century Spanish novelists
21st-century Spanish novelists
Spanish male novelists
University of Murcia alumni
Murcian writers
20th-century Spanish male writers
21st-century Spanish male writers